The Aeroflot Open is an annual open chess tournament played in Moscow and sponsored by the airline Aeroflot. It was established in 2002 and quickly grew to be the strongest open tournament; in 2013 it was converted to a rapid and blitz event, while in 2014 it wasn't held. The first event had around 80 grandmasters, while in the second event 150 grandmasters participated. The tournament is played using the Swiss system and the winner is invited to the Dortmund chess tournament held later in the same year, a tradition begun in 2003. Beside the main tournament (A Group), there are also B and C-class tournaments.

Winners
The name of the winner is boldfaced as in some editions, a few players ended with the same overall score.

Notes

References
 Reports from Chessbase: 2002, 2003, 2004, 2005, 2006, 2007, 2008, 2009, 2010, 2013 blitz, 2013 rapid final
 Results from TWIC: 2002, 2003, 2004, 2005, 2006, 2007, 2008, 2009, 2010
 On the 2002 edition from ruchess.com 2002

Chess competitions
Sports competitions in Moscow
Chess in Russia
2002 in chess
Recurring sporting events established in 2002
Aeroflot
2002 establishments in Russia